Kim Taylor may refer to:
 Kim Taylor (musician) (born 1973), American singer-songwriter
 Kimmie Taylor (born 1989), English fighter with the Kurdish Women's Protection Units (YPJ) and the first British woman to join a female militia in Syria
 Kim Taylor Bennett, British–American journalist and presenter
 Kim Taylor (Neighbours) (active 1985–2017), a character from the television show Neighbours
 Kim Taylor (educationalist) (1922–2013), British educationalist
 Magenta Devine (1957–2019), born Kim Taylor, British television presenter and journalist
 Kim Taylor (entrepreneur) (born 1981/2), American CEO of Cluster, former founder of Ranku, was on reality television show Start-Ups: Silicon Valley
 Kim Taylor (politician) (born 1978), American politician
 Kim Taylor Reece, Hawaiian artist